SSVP may refer to:
 Society of Saint Vincent de Paul, an international Catholic charitable organization
 SSVP docking system, the standard "probe-and-drogue" docking mechanism of Russian spacecraft
 Sree Sankara Vidyapeetam is a senior secondary school located in Mattanur, Kerala, India